Roll Red Roll is a 2018 American documentary film, directed and produced by Nancy Schwartzman. It follows the Steubenville High School rape case.

The film had its world premiere at the Tribeca Film Festival on April 22, 2018. It was released in a limited release on March 22, 2019, by Together Films, prior to its debut on POV on PBS on June 17, 2019.

Plot 
The documentary looks into the Steubenville High School rape case that occurred in August 2012. It also documents Alexandra Goddard's investigation and documentation of the crimes through her true crime blog.

Cast 
 Alexandria Goddard 
 Rachel Dissell
 J.P. Rigaud

Release
The film had its world premiere at the Tribeca Film Festival on April 22, 2018. In February 2019, Together Films acquired U.S. distribution rights to the film, while POV acquired broadcast distribution rights to the film. The film was released in a limited release on March 22, 2019, prior to its debut on POV on PBS on June 17, 2019.

Reception

Critical response 
Metacritic, which assigns a weighted average score, rates the film 83 out of 100, based on 9 reviews, indicating "Universal acclaim".

Jeannette Catsoulis of The New York Times wrote, "A tough but essential watch, “Roll Red Roll” documents how a sexual assault in a declining Appalachian town became an international cause célèbre." Owen Gleiberman of Variety wrote, "... piercingly relevant and disturbing documentary about an infamous high school rape case...". Oliver Jones of The Observer wrote, "And while it is good that a director as versed on the subject of consent as Schwartzman is bringing her unwavering eye to the problem, it makes it all the more painful that we seem even further away from solving the issue then we were on that fateful August night in Ohio seven years ago." Frank Scheck of The Hollywood Reporter wrote, "Difficult to watch, but essential viewing."

Accolades

References

External links 

 
 
 
 Alexandra Goddard website

2018 films
2018 documentary films
American documentary films
Documentary films about violence against women
Rape in the United States
History of women in Ohio
Steubenville, Ohio
Documentary films about Ohio
2010s English-language films
2010s American films